Caraway Creek is a  long 5th order tributary to the Uwharrie River, in Randolph County, North Carolina.

Course

Watershed

See also
List of rivers of North Carolina

References

Rivers of North Carolina
Rivers of Randolph County, North Carolina